A distributive pronoun considers members of a group separately, rather than collectively.

They include  either, neither and others.

 "to each his own" — 'each2,(pronoun)' Merriam-Webster's Online Dictionary (2007)
 "Men take each other's measure when they react." — Ralph Waldo Emerson

Besides distributive pronouns, there are also distributive determiners (also called distributive adjectives). The pronouns and determiners often have the same form:
 Each went his own way (each used as a pronoun, without an accompanying noun)
 Each man went his own way (each used as a determiner, accompanying the noun man)
Each of the answers is correct (each used as  a pronoun, with an accompanying prepositional phrase of the answers)

Languages other than English

Biblical Hebrew
A common distributive idiom in Biblical Hebrew used an ordinary word for man, ish. Brown Driver Briggs only provides four representative examples—Gn 9:5; 10:5; 40:5; Ex 12:3.
Of the many other examples of the idiom in the Hebrew Bible, the best known is a common phrase used to describe everyone returning to their own homes. It is found in 1 Samuel 10:25 among other places.

... '''ish l'beyto.
... a man to his house. [literal]
... each went home. [sense]
This word, ish, was often used to distinguish men from women. "She shall be called Woman because she was taken out of Man,"  is well known, but the distinction is also clear in Gn 19:8; 24:16 and 38:25 (see note for further references). However, it could also be used generically in this distributive idiom (Jb 42:11; I Ch 16:3).

Greek
The most common distributive pronoun in classical Greek was hekastos (each).

See also
 Adjective
 Pronoun
 Quantification

References

External links

 Jeffrey T. Runner and Elsi Kaiser. 'Binding in Picture Noun Phrases:  Implications for Binding Theory'. In Proceedings of the HPSG05 Conference''. Edited by Stefan Müller. Lisbon: CSLI Publications, 2005.
 Glossary of English Grammar Terms UsingEnglish.com

English grammar
Grammar
Pronouns